Wayne Boyer (born 1937) is a Chicago filmmaker. He is involved in the preservation of architectural history through film and has worked alongside Millie and Morton Goldsholl in creating a new genre of design-based films in advertising. Boyer studied at the Institute of Design alongside filmmaker Larry Janiak and the filmmaker and photographer Robert Stiegler. Boyer played a central role in the development of Chicago's underground film scene in the 1960s, and he was teaching filmmaking at the University of Illinois at Chicago.

Early life 
Boyer's first introduction to film was in high school while experimenting with his father's camera. While attending Lane Technical High School in the 1950s, Boyer and Larry Janiak attended two iterations of the International Design Conference in Aspen (IDCA). It was at one of these conferences that the two students met Morton and Millie Goldsholl who organized the 1959 conference. After high school, Boyer went on to study at the Institute of Design, along with Janiak who is a film maker in Chicago’s underground film community and graduated in 1970.

Early work 
In 1955, Boyer and his high school peers, Larry Janiak and Ronald Larson, had their animated cartoon films on display at the Tribune Tower Gallery. A 1955 Chicago Tribune article states that all three boys would be “invited to Hollywood to see first-hand film cartoon techniques used in commercial production.”  The trio “developed a specially equipped camera and photography table, valued at more than $1,000” These accomplishments caught the attention of Disney and the group was flown out to LA to visit the Disney studios. After Morton Goldsholl Design Associates hired Boyer, he, along with Larry Janiak, became the directors of Goldsholl filmmaking department.

Films

Later career 
After leaving Goldsholl and Associates in the late 1960s, Boyer went to teach cinema and animation at the University of Illinois at Chicago. He is currently Professor Emeritus. Boyer was also instrumental in the founding of the Center Cinema Coop, “an important film distribution collective operating out of chicago from the years 1968 to 1978”.

Personal life 
Wayne is married to Eleanor Boyer, who played an active role in some of his projects and co-authored "The Loop: Where the Skyscraper Began".

References

1938 births
Living people
Film producers from Illinois
People from Chicago